The flag of Gelderland is a horizontal tricolour of blue, yellow (gold) and black. The flag was determined on 15 April 1953 by the Provinciale Staten. Its colours originate from the coat of arms of Gelderland which in turn was based on the coat of arms of the Guelders.

Flag
Flags of the Netherlands
Flags introduced in 1953